Guilford Vaughan was a state legislator in Mississippi. He represented Panola County, Mississippi in the Mississippi House of Representatives in 1876 and 1877. He was reported to be a Democrat.

See also
African-American officeholders during and following the Reconstruction era

References

19th-century American politicians
Members of the Mississippi House of Representatives
Year of birth missing
Year of death missing